The Supermarine Baby (also called the Supermarine N.1B Baby) was a First World War fighter aircraft that was the earliest example of a single-seat flying boat fighter to be built in the United Kingdom. When it first flew in February 1918 it was the smallest and fastest flying boat then in existence.

Supermarine's chief designer William Hargreaves based his design on the AD Flying Boat. The Baby was given folding wings, a streamlined hull and a  Hispano-Suiza engine. A single aircraft was built by the company which performed well during trials, and the aircraft was fitted with a more powerful engine in August 1918. A production contract was not awarded, as the Admiralty decided to operate the Sopwith Pup and Sopwith Camel fighters from aboard ships. One of the designs for the Baby formed the basis for other aircraft, including the Supermarine Sea Lion I which participated in the 1919 Schneider Trophy race. Supermarine’s future chief designer Reginald Mitchell was probably involved in the Sea Lion's design and preparation for the contest.

Commission
The Baby was designed and built under the direction of the owner of Supermarine, Hubert Scott-Paine, who had joined Pemberton-Billing Limited in 1911. Scott-Paine bought out its original owner, Noel Pemberton Billing, in June 1916, after which the company was renamed Supermarine Aviation Works Limited. During the First World War, the company continued to specialise in producing and maintaining marine aircraft, as testified by its location at Woolston on the banks of the River Itchen, its lack of an aerodrome and its maintenance of a workforce skilled in constructing boats. Scott-Paine forged good links with the Air Department (AD), which took over jurisdiction of the company during the war.

The Baby was notable for being the first single-seat flying boat fighter aircraft to be designed and built in the United Kingdom. It was designed to meet Navy Board specification N.1B. The specification was for a single seat floatplane or flying boat fighter to counter the German Brandenburg aircraft patrolling the North Sea. The Baby was produced under Air Department contract A.S. 3929.

Supermarine received an order for three aircraft. On awarding the contract, the AD established its presence at Supermarine by sending one of its lead designers, Harold Bolas, and his deputies to oversee the production of the Baby.

Design and development

The Baby was designed by Supermarine's chief designer William Hargreaves, who had joined the company in 1916. Hargreaves based his design on the AD Flying Boat,  a two-seater sea patrol and reconnaissance biplane with a poor performance record that had a flexible, tubular body and wings separated by four vertical struts that folded forwards.

Hargreaves produced a design for a pusher biplane with a small single engine, folding single-bay wings and a T-tail. The streamlined wooden hull for the Baby, which was based on the design used in the AD Flying Boat produced by the British designer Linton Hope, had the pilot's cockpit located in the nose. The engine and propeller were positioned so as to minimise the effect of spray during take-off. It was initially designed with a  Hispano-Suiza engine that drove a propeller with four blades.

It had a maximum wing load equal to 36.5 kg/m2 (7.48 lb/ft2).

Operational history
The prototype was given the serial number N59 and first flew after its completion in February 1918. During trials, it handled well and proved to be fast and manoeuvrable, but showed a tendency to ship water into the cockpit when it accelerated. Hargreaves responded to this problem by producing at least six alternative designs for the hull]. According to a 1920 issue of Flight magazine, the aircraft looped twice that February.

In August 1918, the aircraft was fitted with a more powerful Sunbeam Arab  engine. The smallest and fastest flying boat then in existence, its evaluation was completed just prior to the Armistice of 11 November 1918. The performance of the Baby was good enough for a production contract to be awarded, which was close to completion that November.

The Baby never saw action during the war. By November 1918, the Royal Naval Air Service had already been using Sopwith Pup landplanes to fly off platforms aboard ships, and the success of the Pup (and later the Sopwith Camel) was a factor — along with the end of the war — that caused the British government to cancel the N.1B programme. By this time, a second aircraft (named N60) had been built, which never flew. N60 was delivered as spare parts to support testing of N59. A third machine (N61) had yet to be assembled — although the construction of the hull had begun — at the time the programme was abandoned.

Legacy

The Baby was probably Supermarine's most successful design produced during the First World War. The design for N61, which featured one of Hargreaves' revised hull designs, formed the basis for Supermarine's 'A' Single Seater Flying Boat, later named the Sea Lion I when it participated in the 1919 Schneider Trophy. The Baby was also used as the basis for the Supermarine Sea King and the Supermarine Walrus (1933), which later became the standard "spotter" aircraft used to direct gunfire from the Royal Navy's catapult-equipped warships.

The Baby was used to develop the flying boats of the Schneider Trophy. The Sea King evolved to become the Supermarine Sea Lion II, which became the first post-First World War British aircraft to win an international competition when it won the contest in 1922.

It is likely that Reginald Mitchell, who joined Supermarine in 1916, would have been involved in the design changes and preparation of the Sea Lion.

Specifications (N.1B Baby)

Notes

See also

References

Sources

External links
 Photo from the Seawings website

1910s British fighter aircraft
Flying boats
Baby
Biplanes
Single-engined pusher aircraft
Aircraft first flown in 1918